Geylang International Football Club is a professional football club based in Bedok, Singapore, which plays in the Singapore Premier League, the top division of football in Singapore. The club was founded in 1973 with the purpose of building a successful football team that would be remembered for generations to come. They played their first season in 1974, winning the FAS Division Three League which earns a spot in National Football League Division One the following year. They enjoyed their greatest successes in the 1980s and 90s, winning six consecutive FAS Premier League titles.

Geylang International has won the league championship twice, since the inception of a professional league in 1996. They have won the 1997 Singapore FA Cup final and Singapore Cup once. Their greatest season was 1996, when they became the first team to win the league championship and FA Cup. They also reached the 1997 Singapore FA Cup final, 2001 and 2003 Singapore Cup final, and the 2012 Singapore League Cup final as runners-up.

Geylang International has a tradition rivalry with closest neighbour Tampines Rovers. Matches between these two are referred to as the "Eastern Derby".

History

1973 – 1995

Formally founded by Colin Ng in 1973 during a dinner gathering with Arshad Khamis, Gulam Mohamed and Omar Ashiblie, Ng planned to build one of the successful club in Singapore. They were soon known as International Contract Specialists (ICS) FC and played its first friendly match against Rollel FC, a Singapore Business Houses Football League (SBHFL) Division One league club on 15 November 1973 with a 2–0 win.
They made their season debut in 1974, walking away with 2 titles – FAS Division Three League & President's Cup with no losses. This was not too difficult for them as they had several star players and well-known footballers among their ranks. With the likes of Arshad Khamis, Dollah Kassim, Gulam Mohamed, Samad Allapitchay, Kamal Mohd Nor and Robert Sim, they had a formidable side that receives the respect from oppositions. The team coached by The Yap Brothers, Sebastian and Andrew were no stranger to Football Association of Singapore. For the new season, in line with the Football Association of Singapore plans to streamline footballs and have teams on geographical consideration for the Division One League, ICS changed its name to Geylang International as their home ground was based at Geylang Field, Lorong 12. In 1975, they entered the National Football League Division One and won it before adding another title in 1976. Their back to back victory was made sweeter by winning the 1976 President's Cup.

A relegation in 1981 prompted the arrival of a new management committee that guided the club back to the top division in 1983. In 1984, club president Kasim Chik financed the club and businessman Patrick Ang, who joined in 1986, managed to secure sponsors for them. Despite being relegated that year, they returned to Division 1 of the NFL the following season and the golden era began. In 1988, the FAS started a semi-professional league competition called the FAS Premier League as the top tier of the Singapore football league structure. they dominated all eight years of the league, winning six consecutive titles from 1988 to 1993 before finishing third in 1994 and second in 1995. Every game would see their home ground packed to the brim as fans clamoured to catch a game of the Eagles’ skilful players. Subsequently, due to the huge fan following which numbered in the thousands, all their games had to be played either in Jalan Besar Stadium or National Stadium. The success behind winning the FAS Premier League was also aided by the players they had. Notably players such as Malik Awab, Razali Saad, Dollah Kassim, Samad Allapitchay and Robert Sim all contributed to the success of the team. These were players who would also go on to represent the country. It might not be known widely by many but they even managed to attract one of the biggest European stars of that era to turn up in their club's colours.  French forward and legend, Michel Platini visited Singapore to attend a football clinic conducted by them and played half a game for the Eagles to highlight the club's attraction.

1996 – 2011

As Geylang United Football Club, they were one of the eight teams in the inaugural season of the S.League in 1996. They won the first stage (the Tiger Beer Series) of the league season and finished fifth in the second stage (the Pioneer Series). They won the league after defeating SAFFC (the Pioneer Series champions) 2–1 in the Championship Play-off. They completed the season with another trophy, beating the same team on penalties in the Singapore FA Cup. As the team was full of international stars, led by 1998 Iranian World Cup head coach Jalal Talebi, players such as Fandi Ahmad, Kadir Yahaya, David Lee, Hamid Reza Estili, Mohammad Khakpour, and Chris Riley, Vincent Subramaniam (Head Coach for SAFFC) identified them as the Manchester United of Singapore. As league champions, they qualified for the 1997–98 Asian Club Championship but were eliminated after losing 8–2 on aggregate by Kashima Antlers in the first round.

The 1997 season was a disappointing season for them. They failed to defend the S.League title, finishing fifth. The Eagles also failed to defend the FA Cup, after losing to SAFFC in the finals. They did not win any silverware till 2001, when they won their second league title by a close margin. Both forwards, Aleksandar Đurić and Brian Bothwell scored 57 goals for the team. It was the best performing S.League season for the team; scoring 84 goals and conceding 28 goals. Just days after winning the league title, they suffered their worst defeat in history; losing 8–0 to Home United in the Singapore Cup finals. As league champions, they were guaranteed a slot in the qualifying round of the 2002–03 AFC Champions League but were eliminated after losing to Shanghai Shenhua 5–1 on aggregate in the second round.

The 2002 season saw Geylang United finish third in both the S.League and Singapore Cup. They came close to winning their third S.League title and first Singapore Cup in 2003, only to finish runners-up to Home United for both competitions. As runners-up, they qualified to play in the AFC Cup 2004 due to Home United's double. Their debut in the AFC Cup 2004 was an impressive one. Despite losing their opening match, they managed to stay unbeaten for their next five games in the group stage. They went on to qualify for the quarter-finals, beating Perak FA before losing to Al-Wahda in the semi-final.

Geylang United won their first Singapore Cup in 2009, beating Bangkok Glass FC 1–0 at the Jalan Besar Stadium. The win ensured them a place in the 2010 AFC Cup. However, they failed to qualify for the knockout stages, finishing 3rd in the group stages with four draws and two losses.

2012 – 2015

Weeks before the start of the 2012 season, Patrick Ang announced his retirement as club chairman. Ang, who had been with the club since 1986, moved up the ranks at the club as manager; vice-president; president and eventually chairman. He was given the nickname "Geylang's Godfather" after helping the club to gain main and co-sponsors. Former Singapore international, Leong Kok Fann took over the position. Mike Wong stepped down as coach after their 7–1 thrashing by Home United kept the club at the bottom of the league without a point. Under-21 coach, Vedhamuthu Kanan, swopped roles with Wong. Under the guidance of Kanan, the Eagles made it into the League Cup finals; only to lose in the final to Brunei DPMM. In the league itself, Kanan gave the U21 players the chance to be in the first team. It turned out to be a positive effort as some of these players who were given the chance to play in the S.League matches performed better than some of the first team players. They ended the season second from bottom in the nine-team table.

In 2013, the club announced in a pre-season press conference that it would change its club logo and name back to Geylang International FC. Their 2013 season saw the squad in a long-term injury crisis, forcing their then-assistant coach, former Singapore international Mohd Noor Ali to come out of retirement. They finished the season in ninth place.

The 2014 season was something to look out for as Kanan flew to Argentina during the pre-season to look for new foreign players. It was later announced that Leonel Felice, Franco Chivilo and Joaquin Lopez had signed a 1-year contract. In addition, Nazareno Velez joined in as assistant coach. However, the season did not start well. One of the Argentinian players failed to get their employment pass before the season kicked off. Kanan eventually got demoted back to coaching the U-21 team after 3 straight losses. Jorg Steinebrunner was appointed as the new coach 24 hours before their next match. Despite their poor league performance, Steinebrunner almost led the team to the finals of League Cup and Singapore Cup; only to lose both domestic competitions on penalty shoot-outs. The team ended the 2014 season in eighth place.

In 2015, Steinebrunner took this opportunity to get his own players ahead of the new season. The team was inconsistent throughout the season, failing to win most of their matches. After their defeat in the semi-finals of the League Cup, they failed to collect any points for six consecutive games, remaining rooted to the bottom of the table for months. An unbeaten run in their last five matches with 3 wins and 2 draws allowed them to finish one place off the bottom.

2016 – Present

Weeks after the 2015 S.League season ended, it was announced that Ben Teng would replace Leong Kok Fann as club chairman. Ben Teng and his new management committee (comprising mainly Singaporeans who have worked in Dubai/Abu Dhabi previously) set about to revamp the club by recruiting young players from the disbanded LionsXII and Courts Young Lions, anchored by seasoned players such as Daniel Bennett and Indra Sahdan. Four players, Hairul Syirhan, Yuki Ichikawa, Nor Azli Yusoff and Shawal Anuar from the 2015 season were retained. In line with the club's philosophy of promoting young players from within, four Prime League players were promoted to the senior team (one was subsequently released to Young Lions at the request of FAS). The new 2016 squad also featured returning former Geylang Prime League players such as Stanely Ng, Amy Recha and Taufiq Ghani. Former Singapore international and championship winner with the 2001 Geylang team, Hasrin Jailani, was appointed as head coach. His team mate from the 2001 winning team, Mohd Noor Ali, was appointed as assistant head coach and Prime League coach. In its first S-League away match of the 2016 season against title favourites Tampines Rovers, the Eagles recovered from an early 2–0 lead by the hosts to lead 2–3 before an 86th-minute equaliser by the hosts. Geylang International finished 5th out of the 9 teams competing in the 2016 S league.

In June 2017, Mohd Noor Ali took over as head coach of Geylang International, managing the team he had won the 2001 S league with as a player. The Eagles improved on their previous position and attained 4th position in the 2017 S league. It was Geylang International's first top four finish in 14 years 

In 2018, Mohd Noor Ali went to abroad for a 1 year coaching stint with Japanese club Matsumoto Yamaga FC (as part of Geylang International's collaboration with their sponsor Epson). Noor Ali's venture abroad meant Hirotaka Usui took charge of The Eagles for the inaugural 2018 Singapore Premier League. Geylang International finished a disappointing 8th position that season.

In 2019, Mohd Noor Ali returned to Geylang International after guiding Yamaga's “B” team to a league title. The Eagles welcomed new players like former Dutch U-20 Barry Maguire, and retained a strong youthful core in Darren Teh and Zikos Chua, and Azril Suhaili. Zikos Chua scored vital late goals during the season, as the resilient Eagles finished a commendable 5th place in the 2019 Singapore Premier League. The Eagles Ultras watched and cheered on the team to 10 wins out of 24 matches. That season, The Eagles also knocked out defending champions Albirex Niigata (S) en route to finishing 3rd in the 2019 Singapore Cup. The Eagles beat the 2019 Singapore Premier League champions, Brunei DPMM, in the 3rd/4th placing match 12-11 on penalties, after the match ended 2-2.

In 2022, the season will be remembered for Geylang's resilience to finish the season strong, after a slow start. After beating title favourites Lion City Sailors 1-0 in their opening game, Geylang went on an 11 game winless run despite putting in commendable performances. The newly revamped Geylang squad for 2022, consisting of a new group of foreign players - Vincent Bezecourt, Šime Žužul, Rio Sakuma, Takahiro Tezuka had to find a way to get back to winning ways. When Round 2 and 3 of the 2022 Singapore Premier League came around, Geylang International picked up form, picking up 5 wins in 6 games. By beating the Lion City Sailors 3-1 in the final round of matches (Round 4), and ending the season with a 1-1 draw with eventual champions Albirex Niigata (S), Geylang International finished the season 4th, matching their 4th place finish in 2020.

Sponsors

Main Sponsor : Epson

Apparel Sponsor: FBT

Other Sponsors : Broadway, Doctor Stretch, Extra Ordinary People, Optimum Nutrition, True Fitness Singapore

Kit suppliers and shirt sponsors

Seasons

 The 1996 season of the S.League was split into two series. Tiger Beer Series winners Geylang United defeated Pioneer Series winners Singapore Armed Forces in the Championship playoff to clinch the S.League title.
 2003 saw the introduction of penalty shoot-outs if a match ended in a draw in regular time. Winners of penalty shoot-outs gained two points instead of one.

Performance in AFC competitions
 AFC Champions League: 1 appearance
2002–03: Qualifying East – 3rd Round

 Asian Club Championship: 4 appearances
1989: Qualifying Stage
1990: Qualifying Stage
1991: Qualifying Stage
1998: First Round

AFC Cup: 2 appearances
2004: Semi-finals
2010: Group stage

 Asian Cup Winners Cup: 2 appearances
1990/91: First Round
1991/92: First Round

Club officials

In February 2020, Thomas Gay, co-founder and deputy chairman of Goodrich Global Pte Ltd, and the club's vice-chairman for the last two years, took over from Ben Teng as the chairman of Geylang International. Ben Teng will remain as the Eagles' adviser and will oversee their strategic direction, specifically in the building of alliances with overseas clubs.

Management
 Chairman: Thomas Gay
 Club Advisor: Mohd Fahmi Aliman, Ben Teng
 Honorary Secretary: Andy Wang
 Honorary Treasurer: Lim Yiak Tiam
 General Manager: Jason Jayden Chua
 Team Manager: Leonard Koh
 Finance Manager: Adelene Wee
 Clubhouse Manager: Maureen Chia
 Head of Media: Calvin Koh

Technical Team
 SPL Head Coach: Mohd Noor Ali
 Goalkeeper Coach: Yusri Aziz
 Head of Youth Development: Adil Sulaiman
 U21 Coach: Abdul Musawir
 U17 Coach: Azlan Alipah
 U15 Coach: Nor Azli Yusoff
 Sports Scientist: Andi Agus
 Sports Trainer: Benjamin Singh
 Logistics Officer: Abdul Latiff

COE team technical staff
 COE Head Coach: Vedhamuthu Kanan
 COE U19 Coach: Sofiyan Hamid
 COE U16 Coach TBC
 COE Goalkeeper Coach: Narong Saiket
 COE Fitness Trainer: TBC
 COE Sports Trainer: TBC
 Logistic Officer: TBC

Managers
 Haji Ahmad Bakri Fahrin (1974–76)
 Dennis Bent (1977–78)
 Cheng Meng Sak (1979)
 Zayid Ramsay (1980–88)
 Ibrahim Awang (1989)
 Sulaiman Karim (1989–91)
 Subhash Singh (1991–94)
 Vincent Subramaniam (1994–95)
 Jalal Talebi (1996–97)
 Robert Lim (1997)
 Douglas Moore (1998)
 Alan Vest (1999–00)
 Seak Poh Leong (2000)
 Jang Jung (2001)
 Seak Poh Leong (2002)
 Jang Jung (2002)
 Scott O'Donell (2003–05)
 Seak Poh Leong (2005)
 Attaphol Buspakom (2006)
 Lim Tong Hai (2006–07)
 Joseph Herel (2008)
 Lim Tong Hai (2008)
 Mike Wong (2009–12)
 Kanan Vedhamuthu (2012–14)
 Jorg Steinebrunner (2014–15)
 Hasrin Jailani (2016–2017)
 Mohd Noor Ali (2017)
 Hirotaka Usui (2018)
 Mohd Noor Ali (2019–)

Honours

Domestic
League
 S.League: 2
 1996, 2001
 FAS Premier League: 6
 1988, 1989, 1990, 1991, 1992, 1993
 National Football League Division One: 3
 1975, 1976, 1977
 FAS Division Three: 1
1974

Cup
 Singapore League Cup: 1
 2016 (Plate Winners)
 Singapore Cup: 1
 2009
 Singapore FA Cup: 1
 1996
 President's Cup: 6
 1974, 1976, 1978, 1990, 1991, 1995

Reserves
 Prime League: 3
 1998, 2006, 2011

 Singapore FA Cup: 1
 2007

Ground and fan support

The Eagles’ home ground is the Bedok Stadium, located in the eastern part of Singapore. It is used both for football matches and community events. Besides that, the pitch is also used by the club for their training sessions. The stadium has a natural grass football pitch, an 8-lane running track and some athletic facilities. The stadium are closed to the public during official events and S.League matches. The stadium can hold up to 3,900 spectators. The stadium is currently managed by the Singapore Sports Council.

The Eagles’ home ground moved to Our Tampines Hub for the 2019 Singapore Premier League season, which they share with Tampines Rovers FC.

Wherever The Eagles play, they are well supported by a loyal and vocal set of supporters called The Ultras Eagles. Usually decked in black and green, they come with loud drums and a strong set of lungs, roaring on the team and setting a matchday scene unlike anything most of Singapore have ever seen. The passionate supporters have also formed a close bond with the team. This is especially evident when the Ultras and The Eagles players and coaching staff  heartily participate in a post match song together, after every game, whether the team wins, loses, or draws.

Official anthem 
 
Geylang International Football Club's Official Anthem, "We Are The Mighty Eagles" was launched on 22 February 2022. The anthem will be played at all home matches, before kick-off, half-time and whenever a goal is scored by the Eagles. The anthem is composed by Evil Singing Pandas a band from Singapore and Bangkok, Thailand.

The anthem is also being used in various videos promoting the club, including a behind the scenes pre-season photoshoot and tribute clip to the main sponsor Epson in 2022.

Players

U23

U23
U23

U21

U21
U21
U21
U21
U21
U21
U21
U21
U21
U21
U21
U21
U21
U21
U21
U21
U21
U21
U21

Players on loan

Former players

  PJ Roberts

Club Captains

Media controversies

2016 Post-season issues

On 7 November 2016, The Straits Times reported that Geylang International will not pay two of their players' December salaries. Former Singapore national captain Indra Sahdan and Carlos Delgado were affected. It is believed that the club docked Indra's salary as it is displeased that he missed many training sessions while Delgado had some disagreement with the management over money. Club chairman, Ben Teng revealed that as many as 12 players signed two-year full-time contracts at the beginning of this season. The management committee made most of the decisions regarding the handing out of contracts last season, before Teng came on board to replace Leong Kok Fann. Teng added that he has spoken to all the players and will intend to honour their contracts. In addition, some players, who supplemented their income by driving for Uber, have been ordered to stop such off-field activity. Teng revealed his concern and decided to impose a ban on such activities. The players have signed declarations that they do not have other employment outside of football. As professional, players should be focused on raising our playing standards and should not be distracted by off-field activities.

2018 Foreign Players Recruitment

On 13 February 2018, Geylang International attempted to recruit foreign players online. The advertisement was swiftly removed once the public took notice of it. Despite this, Geylang International continued to boast a crop of talented foreign players. Japanese central defender and fan favourite Yuki Ichikawa played in his 7th season with Geylang International during the 2020 Singapore Premier League season. Yuki will be remembered for scoring the dramatic last minute winner against his former club Albirex Niigata in the first game of the Eagles' 2019 season. Barry Maguire also starred for The Eagles in the 2019 season, scoring a tremendous long range goal against the Young Lions, winning the 2019 Singapore Premier League Goal of the Year award.

Affiliated clubs

  Ho Chi Minh City
  Matsumoto Yamaga

External links

References

 
Football clubs in Singapore
Association football clubs established in 1974
1974 establishments in Singapore
Singapore Premier League clubs